Sheila McClean, RUA, (13 August 1932 – 5 August 2016) was an Irish painter, whose work was in the impressionist style.

Life and work
Sheila McClean was originally from Moville, County Donegal, Ireland and attended Thornhill College in Derry, Northern Ireland where she later lived.  She painted the land and sea around her.

Derek Hill, a great admirer of her work, said, "Her paintings capture the Donegal we all feel in retrospect".

Joseph McWilliams, PPRUA, said, "Her landscapes are painted landscapes, her boglands are expressive marks of paint, on richly textured surfaces redolent of bog cotton and dank brown pools..... Her work reflects a deep understanding of both place and paint".

Commenting on her most recent one woman exhibition McClean stated:
"Painting for me is a necessary means of self-expression. My desire as a painter is to establish a relationship between intuitive imagery, and a spontaneous method of painting.  I try to achieve this, through a combination of economic statements, which are personal rather than purely descriptive and keeping myself aware of the life and integrity of the paint itself."
"Paint is the image. Image is the paint"

Collections
 National Self Portrait Collection, Limerick.
 Derek Hill Collection, County Donegal.
 D.F.P (NI Civil Service).
 UTV Collection, Belfast.
 The Harverty Trust.
 Social Democratic and Labour Party (SDLP) Offices, Belfast.
 UNISON Collection, NI & UK.

Commissions
 Stations of the Cross, St. Pious X Church, Moville, Co. Donegal.
 Belfast Calendar  1991

Further reading

 (Catalogue of exhibition which opened in the Glebe Gallery, Churchill; artists include Sheila McClean.

See also
List of painters
List of Irish artists

References

External links
Royal Ulster Academy of Arts
Article on Recent Exhibition  Belfast Telegraph (Subscription)

1932 births
2016 deaths
Irish Impressionist painters
20th-century Irish painters
21st-century Irish painters
People from County Donegal
Irish women painters
20th-century Irish women artists
21st-century Irish women artists
Members of the Royal Ulster Academy